This is a list of mayors of Gatineau, Quebec. Note that major amalgamations occurred in 1975 and again in 2002.

Théodore Baribeau (1933-1937)
Palma Racicot (1937-1939)
J. Edouard Charette (1939)
Palma Racicot (1939-1945)
J. Léo Smith (1945-1956)
Eloi Baribeau (1956-1957)
Roland Théorêt (1957-1959)
Aurèle Graveline (1959-1962)
Roland Théorêt (1962-1965)
Jacques Poulin (1965-1971)
Ludovic Routhier (1971)
John-R. Luck (1971-1975)
Donald Poirier (provisional council, 1975)
John-R. Luck (1975-1983)
Gaétan Cousineau (1983-1988)
Robert Labine (1988-1994)
Guy Lacroix (1994-1999)
Robert Labine (1999-2001)
Yves Ducharme (2002-2005)
Marc Bureau (2005-2013)
Maxime Pedneaud-Jobin, Action Gatineau (2013–2021)
France Bélisle, (2021–present)

Election results

2021

2017

2013

2009

2005

2001

1999

1995

1991

1987

1983

1979

1975

Mayors of Hull (1875-2001)

George Jacob Marston, Sr. (1875-1876)
Henri Isaie Richer (1876-1877)
Christopher C. Brigham (1877-1878)
Charles Everett Graham (1878-1879)
Charles Leduc (1879-1881)
Ezra Butler Eddy (1881-1885)
Charles Leduc (1885-1886)
Alfred Rochon (1886-1887)
Ezra Buttler Eddy (1887-1888)
Alfred Rochon (1888-1889)
Éraste d'Odet d'Orsonnens (1889-1890)
William Francis Scott (1890-1891)
Ezra Buttler Eddy (1891-1892)
Louis Napoléon Champagne (1892-1893)
Edmond Stanislas Aubry (1893-1894)
Richard Alexis Helmer (1894)
Edmond Stanislas Aubry (1894-1895)
Charles Everett Graham (1895-1896)
Louis Napoléon Champagne (1896-1897)
William Francis Scott (1897-1898)
Ferdinand Barette (1898-1900)
Richard Alexis Helmer (1900-1901)
Victor Ovide Falardeau (1901-1903)
Ferdinand Gendron (1903-1904)
Victor Ovide Falardeau (1904-1905)
Edmond Stanislas Aubry (1905-1906)
Augustin Thibault (1906-1909)
Joseph Éloi Fontaine (1909-1911)
Urgèle Archambault (1911-1912)
Hormidas Dupuis (1912-1914)
Joseph Bourque (1914-1916)
Urgèle Archambault (1916-1920)
Louis Cousineau (1920-1922)
Hilaire Thérien (1922-1924)
Louis Cousineau (1924-1926)
Théodore Lambert (1926-1936)
Alphonse Moussette (1936-1940)
Raymond Brunet (1941-1948)
Alphonse Moussette (1949-1951)
Henri Gauthier (1952-1953)
Alexis Caron (1953-1955)
Thomas Moncion (1955-1959)
Armand Turpin (1959-1964)
Marcel D'Amour (1964-1972)
Jean-Marie Séguin (1972-1974)
Gilles Rocheleau (1974-1981)
Michel Légère (1981-1991)
Marcel Beaudry (1991-1992)
Yves Ducharme (1992-2001)

Mayors of Pointe-Gatineau (1876-1974)

James O'Hagan (1876-1877)
Pierre Charette (1877-1879)
Joseph Moreau (1879-1880)
Joseph Smeyers Stassardt (1880)
Isaac Lépine (1880-1882)
Francois-Xavier Bouvier (1882-1884)
Pierre Charette (1884-1886)
Louis-Philippe Sylvain (1886-1894)
Joseph Cousineau (1894-1895)
Damas Lafortune (1895-1899)
Louis-Philippe Sylvain (1899-1904)
Joseph Cousineau (1904-1905)
Ovila Robitaille (1905-1907)
Damas Lafortune (1907)
Joseph Cousineau (1907)
Alfred Paulin (1907-1909)
Gabriel Vaive (1909)
Alfred Paulin (1909-1911)
Sylvio Lafortune (1911-1913)
Mazenod Lafontaine (1913)
Gabriel Vaive (1913-1914)
Mazenod R. Lafontaine (1914-1918)
Rodolphe Moreau (1918-1922)
Philias Legault (1922-1923)
Rodolphe Moreau (1923-1924)
Sylvio Lafortune (1924)
Ernest Charron (1924-1929)
Estor Charette (1929-1930)
Rodolphe Moreau (1930-1943)
Arthur Moreau (1943-1945)
Daniel Lafortune (1945-1959)
Théodore Joly (1959-1961)
Henri Lapointe (1961-1963)
Daniel Lafortune (1963-1971)
Pierre Lafontaine (1971-1973)
Jean-Marc Cloutier (1973-1975)

Mayors of Templeton (1920-1974)
John Stewart (1920-1924)
Émile Victor Désy (1924-1929)
Jean Beauchamp (1929)
Émile Victor Désy (1929-1934)
J. Ulderic Leclerc (1934-1936)
J.E. Campeau (1936-1941)
Marie-Joseph Schingh (1941-1947)
Russell Williams (1947-1953)
David Mitchell (1953-1958)
Jean-Paul Hurtubise (1958-1961)
Lucien Dumais (1961-1965)
Roger Traversy (1965-1967)
Jean Lorrain (1967-1970)
François Leclerc (1970-1974)

Mayors of East Templeton (1886-1974)

Alexander McLaurin (1886)
John McLaurin (1886-1888)
Archibald S. McLaurin (1888-1889)
John McLaurin (1889-1894)
Fabien Campeau (1894-1899)
Nephtalie Beauchamp (1899-1902)
Archibald S. McLaurin (1902-1904)
Nephtalie Beauchamp (1905-1908)
John Stewart (1908-1912)
Damase Madore (1912-1916)
John Stewart (1916-1917)
Damase Madore (1917-1924)
Henri-Luc Madore (1924-1925)
Charles H. Mitchell (1925-1929)
Paul-Émile Desjardins (1929-1937)
Allen Williams (1937-1945)
Josephat Couture (1945-1963)
Robert Mongeon (1963-1965)
Josephat Couture (1965-1969)
Gaëtan Quesnel (1969-1973)
Gaston Bigras (1973-1974)

Mayors of East Templeton (East part) (1920-1974)
Henri Routhier (1920-1939)
Josaphat Couture (1939)
C. Omer Chauret (1939-1947)
Albert Plouffe (1947-1961)
Jean-Noël Mongeon (1961-1969)
Domina Scantland (1969-1972)
Jean Saint-Louis (1972-1974)

Mayors of West Templeton (1886-1974)

Joseph Laurin (1896-1897)
John T. Murphy (1897-1900)
John McGlashan (1900-1902)
John Laurin (1902-1904)
John T. Murphy (1904-1906)
John McGlashan (1906-1907)
John T. Murphy (1907-1908)
John Laurin (1908-1910)
John T. Murphy (1910-1912)
John Laurin (1912-1914)
John T. Murphy (1914-1916)
John Laurin (1916-1917)
John T. Murphy (1917-1921)
William A. Scharfe (1921-1923)
Ferdinand Charette (1923-1925)
John T. Murphy (1925-1929)
Ferdinand Charette (1929-1935)
John E. Williams (1935-1941)
Charles K. McElroy (1941-1945)
Edmond Charette (1945-1949)
Peter A. Murphy (1949-1952)
George L. Davidson (1952-1949)
Harry Scullion (1959-1963)
John Kearns (1963-1967)
Noël Charette (1967-1974)

Mayors of Touraine (1889-1974)
Alex Prud'homme (1889-1894)
Robert Kerr (1894-1902)
Thomas Barrett (1902-1915)
Allan Fraser (1915-1921)
Edward Poulin (1921-1933)
Samuel D. McClelland (1933-1947)
Gabriel Maloney (1947-1852)
Alfred Hogan (1952-1955)
Gabriel Maloney (1955-1957)
Aldège Godmaire (1957-1959)
Gabriel Maloney (1959-1961)
Hervé Maisonneuve (1961-1963)
Georges St-Jacques (1963-1969)
Jean-Paul Hébert (1969-1972)
Donald Poirier (1972-1974)

Sources

History of mayors of Hull

History of Gatineau

Gatineau